{{DISPLAYTITLE:C17H18N2O3S}}
The molecular formula C17H18N2O3S (molar mass: 330.40 g/mol, exact mass: 330.1038 u) may refer to:

 Atibeprone
 SB-205384

Molecular formulas